There have been four baronetcies created for persons with the surname Rich, two in the Baronetage of England, one in the Baronetage of Great Britain and one in the Baronetage of the United Kingdom. As of 2008 three of the creations are extinct while one is dormant.

The Rich Baronetcy, of Sunning in the County of Berkshire, was created in the Baronetage of England on 20 March 1660 for Thomas Rich, a wealthy Turkey Merchant who also represented Reading in the House of Commons. The second baronet was member of parliament for Reading and Gloucester. The title became extinct on the death of the fifth baronet in 1803. See also the 1863 creation below.

The Rich Baronetcy, of London, was created in the Baronetage of England on 24 January 1676 for Charles Rich, of Mulberton, Norfolk, with remainder to his son-in-law and distant cousin Robert Rich, son of Nathaniel Rich, who inherited the baronetcy the following year. He was a successful politician. His younger son, the fourth Baronet, was a distinguished cavalry officer. The title became extinct on the death of the sixth Baronet in 1799.

The Rich Baronetcy, of Shirley House in the County of Southampton, was created in the Baronetage of Great Britain on 28 July 1791 for Reverend Charles Rich. He was the son-in-law of the fifth Baronet of 1676, and had inherited the estates and assumed the name and arms of Rich. This creation became dormant upon the death of the sixth Baronet in 1983, but heirs are still thought to be living.

The Rich Baronetcy, of Sunning in the County of Berkshire, was created in the Baronetage of the United Kingdom on 22 January 1863 for the Liberal politician Henry Rich, the natural son of the fifth Baronet of the 1660 creation. The title became extinct on his death without children in 1869.

Rich baronets, of Sunning (1661)

Sir Thomas Rich, 1st Baronet (c. 1601–1667)
Sir William Rich, 2nd Baronet (c. 1654–1711)
Sir Robert Rich, 3rd Baronet (1673–1724)
Sir William Rich, 4th Baronet (c. 1702–1762)
Sir Thomas Rich, 5th Baronet (c. 1733–1803)

Rich baronets, of London (1676)

 Sir Charles Rich, 1st Baronet (c. 1619–30 May 1677), Rich was the fourth son of Sir Edwin Rich and grandson of Robert Rich, 2nd Baron Rich (see Earl of Warwick). He married Elizabeth Cholmeley, by whom he had two daughters and co-heirs, Elizabeth, married Peter Civell, and Mary, married Robert Rich, of Stondon, Essex. Each inherited one of his manors. In 1676, he was created a baronet, with a special remainder to his son-in-law, Robert, who was a distant relation. He died the year after and was buried in the parish church of Enfield Town.

The baronetcy passed to his son-in-law:

Sir Robert Rich, 2nd Baronet (c. 1648–1699)

He had two sons:

Sir Charles Rich, 3rd Baronet (c. 1680–19 October 1706). Appointed Vice-Admiral of Suffolk on 25 September 1699, succeeding his father shortly before the latter's death, he held the office until 8 July 1702, when he was replaced by Lionel Tollemache, 3rd Earl of Dysart. He died without issue, causing the baronetcy to pass to his brother.
Sir Robert Rich, 4th Baronet (1685–1768)

He in turn had two sons:

Sir Robert Rich, 5th Baronet (1717–19 May 1785), had only a daughter, Mary Frances, causing the baronetcy to pass to his brother. Mary Frances Rich married the Reverend Charles Bostock, of Shirley House, Hampshire, who assumed the surname of Rich in 1790 and was himself created a baronet in 1791.
 Sir George Rich, 6th Baronet (13 June 1728 – 8 January 1799)

Rich baronets, of Shirley House (1791)

Sir Charles Rich, 1st Baronet (c. 1752–1824)
Sir Charles Henry Rich, 2nd Baronet (1784–1857)
Sir Charles Henry John Rich, 3rd Baronet (1812–1866)
Sir Charles Henry Stuart Rich, 4th Baronet (1859–1913)
Sir Almeric Edmund Frederic Rich, 5th Baronet (1859–1948)
Sir Almeric Frederic Conness Rich, 6th Baronet (1897–1983)

The heir to the baronetcy was believed to be Gordon Leonard Rich (1921-1996).

Rich baronets, of Sunning, Berkshire (1863)
Sir Henry Rich, 1st Baronet (1803–1869)

Notes

References
 Kidd, Charles, Williamson, David (editors), Debrett's Peerage and Baronetage (1990 edition). New York: St Martin's Press, 1990., 
 
 George Edward Cokayne, The Complete Baronetage
 volume III (1903) pp. 180–181
 volume IV (1904) pp. 72–74
 volume V (1906) pp. 276–277

Baronetcies in the Baronetage of Great Britain
Dormant baronetcies
Extinct baronetcies in the Baronetage of England
Baronetcies created with special remainders
Extinct baronetcies in the Baronetage of the United Kingdom
1661 establishments in England
1791 establishments in Great Britain
1863 establishments in the United Kingdom
Rich family